The following is a list of the television networks and announcers who have broadcast college football's LendingTree Bowl throughout the years.

Television broadcasts

Radio broadcasts
The radio broadcasts have been done under a branding of the sponsor's name plus "bowl network". The broadcast team is provided by Grace Unlimited Media. Originally Nevada Sports Network produced the bowl broadcasts with Alex Shelton acting as the producer, but those are also now handled by Grace Unlimited Media.

References

Broadcasters
LendingTree Bowl
LendingTree Bowl
LendingTree Bowl